is a 2000 Japanese film directed by Junji Sakamoto. At the 24th Japan Academy Prize, it won one award, and received four other nominations.

Plot
Sullen and withdrawn "ugly" elder sister Masako toils endlessly with mending chores in her widowed mother's dry cleaning shop, seething with hatred for her flashy younger sister Yukari, who visits only for free laundry service. When mother dies, and Yukari persists in her abuse, Masako cracks and strangles her. She flees, and takes a number of identities and odd jobs, meeting people as she goes. To her surprise, Masako finds people in general to be kind and helpful (although she's sexually abused more than once), and she blossoms as a personality, even to the extent of becoming a popularly liked bar hostess like her murdered sister.

Cast 
 Naomi Fujiyama
 Michiyo Okusu
 Riho Makise
 Kenji Sakaguchi

Awards and nominations 
24th Japan Academy Prize. 
Won: Best Director - Junji Sakamoto
Nominated: Best Picture
Nominated: Best Screenplay - Junji Sakamoto and Isamu Uno
Nominated: Best Actress in a Supporting Role - Michiyo Okusu
Nominated: Best Music - Yasuhiro Kobayashi
25th Hochi Film Award 
Won: Best Film
Won: Best Actress - Naomi Fujiyama
22nd Yokohama Film Festival 
Won: Best Film
Won: Best Director - Junji Sakamoto
Won: Best Screenplay - Junji Sakamoto and Isamu Uno
Won: Best Actress - Naomi Fujiyama

References

External links 
 

2000 films
Films directed by Junji Sakamoto
2000s Japanese-language films
Best Film Kinema Junpo Award winners
2000s Japanese films